Trichostema lanceolatum, with the common names vinegarweed and camphor weed, is an annual flowering herb of the mint family native to western North America.

The common name 'vinegarweed' originated due to its foliage containing volatile oils that have a strong vinegar odor.  The oils have phytotoxic properties, which help the plant compete by killing or injuring other plant species.

Distribution
The plant is native to the Western United States from the Pacific Coast Ranges in Washington and Oregon, through California, and to northern Baja California state in México.

California habitats it grows in include: chaparral; coastal sage scrub; and Northern, Southern, and Foothill oak woodlands.

Description
Trichostema lanceolatum is an annual herbaceous wildflower, growing under  in height.

In hot weather the vinegar smell of the plant becomes intense as the oils in the tissues permeate the air.

The bilaterally symmetrical flowers, of pale blue to purple, are in long clusters in leaf axils on short green stems. The blooming period is from August to October.

Plants reproduce only by seed that are primarily dispersed by falling to the ground below the parent plant.

Uses
The plant is an important a pollen source for native bees and other insects. When a pollinating insect alights on the lower lobes of the corolla, and inserts its mouth parts into the nectar-containing lower section of the same tube, the narrow corolla portion above is straightened and snaps rapidly downward brushing pollen onto the insect's back.

The volatile oils make it unpalatable to grazing and foraging animals.

Medical plant
The indigenous peoples of California used this as a traditional medicinal plant, as a cold and fever remedy, a pain reliever, and a flea insect repellent.

References

External links

Calflora Database: Trichostema lanceolatum (Vinegarweed)
 Jepson Manual eFlora (TJM2) treatment of Trichostema lanceolatum
USDA Plants Profile for Trichostema lanceolatum (vinegarweed)
UC Photos gallery: Trichostema lanceolatum

lanceolatum
Flora of California
Flora of Baja California
Flora of Oregon
Flora of the Sierra Nevada (United States)
Natural history of the California chaparral and woodlands
Natural history of the California Coast Ranges
Natural history of the Central Valley (California)
Natural history of the Peninsular Ranges
Natural history of the Santa Monica Mountains
Natural history of the Transverse Ranges
Plants described in 1835
Plants used in traditional Native American medicine
Insect repellents
Plant toxin insecticides
Flora without expected TNC conservation status